The 2018 European Open was a men's tennis tournament played on indoor hard courts. It was the third edition of the European Open and part of the ATP World Tour 250 series of the 2018 ATP World Tour. It took place at the Lotto Arena in Antwerp, Belgium, from October 15 to October 21.

Singles main-draw entrants

Seeds

1 Rankings are as of October 8, 2018

Other entrants
The following players received wildcards into the singles main draw:
  Ruben Bemelmans 
  Milos Raonic
  Frances Tiafoe

The following players received entry from the qualifying draw:
  Marcel Granollers
  Tallon Griekspoor
  Ilya Ivashka
  Sergiy Stakhovsky

The following players received entry as lucky losers:
  Salvatore Caruso
  Constant Lestienne
  Stéphane Robert

Withdrawals
Before the tournament
  Nikoloz Basilashvili → replaced by  Yuki Bhambri
  Roberto Carballés Baena → replaced by  Salvatore Caruso
  David Goffin → replaced by  Jiří Veselý
  Tallon Griekspoor → replaced by  Stéphane Robert
  Jozef Kovalík → replaced by  Constant Lestienne
During the tournament
  Ilya Ivashka

Doubles main-draw entrants

Seeds

1 Rankings are as of October 8, 2018

Other entrants
The following pairs received wildcards into the doubles main draw:
  Ruben Bemelmans /  Joris De Loore
  Sander Gillé /  Joran Vliegen

Finals

Singles 

  Kyle Edmund defeated  Gaël Monfils, 3–6, 7–6(7–2), 7–6(7–4)

Doubles 

  Nicolas Mahut /  Édouard Roger-Vasselin defeated  Marcelo Demoliner /  Santiago González, 6–4, 7–5

References

External links 
 

2018
2018 ATP World Tour
2018 in Belgian tennis
October 2018 sports events in Belgium